Batrachoidinae is a subfamily of toadfish in the family Batrachoididae. It contains 25 species in the following 6 genera:

 Amphichthys (2 species)
 Batrachoides (9 species)
 Opsanus (6 species)
 Potamobatrachus (1 species)
 Sanopus (6 species)
 Vladichthys (1 species)

References

Batrachoididae